The Hiro H3H1 or Navy Type 90-1 Flying boat was a Japanese flying boat bomber built in 1931. It was the first large all-metal aircraft built in Japan. Only one was completed.

Design and development

The H3H1 was Hiro Naval Arsenal's first large all-metal, stressed-skin  aircraft, though they had long experience of large wooden flying boat design and construction. It was the first Japanese Naval aircraft able to carry a one tonne bomb load. Built in 1931, it was first flown in the spring of 1932.

It had a shoulder-mounted, cantilever wing built around a type of single box spar previously proven by the German company Rohrbach. Its three licence-built, Hispano-Suiza V12 engines were tractor mounted over the wing on multi-strut pylons. Lateral stability on the water was provided by floats at mid-span, mounted on vertical N-struts and braced by inward parallel strut pairs to the wing.

The hull incorporated both Hiro's experience and some features from that of the Supermarine Southampton, with hydrodynamics refined in the water tank of the Naval Technical Research Institution. The H3H1 was flown from a side-by-side, open cockpit well ahead of the wings. There was an open mooring cockpit in the nose, also equipped with a pair of flexibly mounted  machine guns, and other, similarly equipped, gun positions amidships and in the tail. Its tail surfaces were conventional with the tailplane mounted just above the base of the fin and braced to the fuselage on N-struts.

After its first flight the H3H1 flew to Yokohama for extensive testing which revealed problems with aerodynamic stability and with the engine installations. The former led to the addition of auxiliary fins on the tailplane and modification of the tailplane struts to allow its incidence to be adjusted for trimming. The engines had their radiators  moved further aft and different propellers were tested. The modification state was denoted with a dash number suffix, thus the final modification state of the Navy Type 90-1 Flying boat, was the Navy Type 90-1-4 Flying boat.

Despite the changes the stability problems persisted and the contemporary but more traditional Kawanishi H3K biplane was preferred by the Navy. From 1933 the H3H1 was used as an engine test-bed for the Mitsubishi MK1 Shinten  14 cylinder, double-row  radial engine.

Specifications

See also

References

Flying boats
High-wing aircraft
Trimotors
1930s Japanese bomber aircraft
1930s Japanese patrol aircraft
Hiro aircraft